Bowing (also called stooping) is the act of lowering the torso and head as a social gesture in direction to another person or symbol. It is most prominent in Asian cultures but it is also typical of nobility and aristocracy in many European countries. It is also used in religious contexts, as a form of worship or veneration. Sometimes the gesture may be limited to lowering the head such as in Indonesia, and in many cultures several degrees of the lowness of the bow are distinguished and regarded as appropriate for different circumstances. It is especially prominent in Nepal, India, Cambodia, Thailand, Laos, Vietnam, China, Korea, and Japan, where it may be executed standing or kneeling.  Some bows are performed equally by two or more people while others are unequal – the person bowed to either does not bow in return or performs a less low bow in response.  A nod of the head may be regarded as the minimal form of bow; forms of kneeling, genuflection, or prostration which involves the hands or whole body touching the ground, are the next levels of gesture.

In Europe and the Commonwealth

In European cultures—aside from bows done by performers on stage such as at the curtain call—bowing is traditionally an exclusively male practice, and women instead perform a related gesture called a "curtsey" or "curtsy". The depth of the bow was related to the difference in rank or degree of respect or gratitude. In Early Modern European courtly circles, males were expected to "bow and scrape" (hence the term "bowing and scraping" for what appears to be excessive ceremony). "Scraping" refers to the drawing back of the right leg as one bows, such that the right foot scrapes the floor or earth. Typically, while executing such a bow, the man's right hand is pressed horizontally across the abdomen while the left is held out from the body.  Social bowing is all but extinct, except in some very formal settings, though hand-kissing of women by men, which of necessity includes a bow, lingers on in some cultures.

In the British, Australian, and other Commonwealth courts, lawyers and clerks (of both sexes) are expected to perform a cursory bow of the head only to the judge when entering or leaving a law court that is in session. Similar gestures are made to the Speaker of the House of Commons when entering or leaving the chamber of the House of Commons in session, and to the monarch by their staff.

Members of the Royal Family of the various Commonwealth Realms are either bowed or curtsied to, depending on the gender of the subject.  Australians are expected to bow to the Governor-General of Australia, the spouse of the Governor-General and state Governors and Lieutenant-Governors.

In Asia

In East Asia

Bows are the traditional greeting in East Asia, particularly in Japan, Korea, China, and Vietnam. In China, and Vietnam, shaking hands or a slight bow have become more popular than a full bow. However, bowing is not reserved only for greetings; it can also be used as a gesture of respect, with different bows used for apologies and gratitude.

Basic bows originate at the waist and are performed with the back straight and the hands at the sides (for men) or clasped in front (for women), and with the eyes down.

Generally, bows can be divided into three main types: informal, formal, and very formal. Informal bows are made at about a fifteen-degree angle and more formal bows at about thirty degrees. Very formal bows are deeper. In extreme cases a kneeling bow is performed, which may be so deep that the forehead touches the floor.

There is an extremely complex etiquette surrounding bowing, including the length and depth of bow, and the appropriate response. For example, if the other person maintains his or her bow for longer than expected (generally about two or three seconds), it is polite to bow again, upon which one may receive another bow in return, often leading to an exchange of progressively lighter bows.

Apology and thanks
Bows are a required and expected part of any apology or expression of thanks in East Asia, especially Japan and Korea.

Bows of apology tend to be deeper and last longer than other types of bow. They occur with frequency during the apology, generally at about 45-50 degrees with the head lowered and lasting for at least the count of three but sometimes longer. The depth, frequency and duration of the bow increases with the sincerity of the apology and the severity of the offense. Bows of thanks follow the same pattern.

Bows of apology are frequently performed at press conferences by high-ranking members of a company that has performed some misdeed, such as producing faulty parts that resulted in a death. The bows are almost invariably performed standing behind a table; the tips of the fingers touch the table while the upper body, held straight, is lowered from the waist until the face is parallel with the tabletop.

Greeting
Bows are commonly used in greeting, both when meeting and when departing. Bows almost automatically accompany the greeting phrases, but generally are no longer used among the immediate family unless addressing a family member after or in anticipation of a long absence or separation.

Bows also replace speaking under certain circumstances. For example, when encountering again a person to whom one has already spoken that day, a silent bow replaces such phrases as "hello" or "hi".

When addressing a subordinate, a manager, supervisor, or other leader generally only nods the head slightly (some may not bow at all), while the subordinate bends forward slightly from the waist.

Shaking hands

When dealing with non-East Asians, many East Asians will shake hands. Since many non-East Asians are familiar with the custom of bowing, this often leads to an awkward combined bow and handshake. Bows may be combined with handshakes or performed before or after shaking hands.

Generally when bowing in proximity to another, as necessitated when combining bowing and shaking hands, people turn slightly to one side to avoid bumping heads.

In China
The kowtow is the highest sign of reverence in Han Chinese culture, but its use has become extremely rare since the collapse of Imperial China. In many situations, the standing bow has replaced the kowtow. However, in modern Chinese societies, bowing is not as formalized as in Japan, South Korea and North Korea. Bowing is normally reserved for occasions such as marriage ceremonies and as a gesture of respect for the deceased, although it still sometimes used for more formal greetings.
In China, three bows are customarily executed at funerals including state funerals,
ancestral worship, and at special ceremonies in commemoration of pater patriae Sun Yat-sen.

As in Japan and Korea, public figures may bow formally to apologize. Chinese Premier  bowed and offered his condolences to stranded railway passengers; Taiwanese Defense Minister  bowed in apology following a faux pas concerning the shooting of former President  in 2004.

In South and Southeast Asia

Similarly to East Asia, bowing is the traditional form of greeting in many South Asian and Southeast Asian countries. A gesture known as the Añjali Mudrā is used as a sign of respect and greeting and involves a bow of varying degrees depending on whom one performs it to and hands pressed together generally at chest level. Practised throughout South Asia and Southeast Asia, the gesture is most commonly used in India, Sri Lanka, Nepal, Bhutan, Bangladesh, Cambodia, Thailand, Laos, Myanmar and Indonesia. Gestures across the region are known by different names such as the sampeah in Cambodia, wai in Thailand,, sembah in Indonesia, namaste in India and Nepal, and in Sri Lanka the gesture is used as a greeting with the word "Ayubowan".

In martial arts

Bowing is an integral part of traditionally-trained martial arts from East Asia (e.g. Aikido or Taekwondo), Southeast Asia (e.g. Muay Thai), or others that were influenced by such arts (e.g. Brazilian Jiu-Jitsu). Bows are used to begin and end practice, sparring bouts and competitions, and when entering and leaving the dojo, or practice room.

Some martial arts bows are different in terms of the position of the arms and hands. For example, a karate bow is performed with the arms at the sides, while other bows, such as a Silat bow, are performed with the hands together and the hands and the arms in front.

In tea ceremony
Bowing is an important part of Japanese tea ceremony. All are usually performed from a kneeling position.  bows are the deepest; from a kneeling position, the bower bends forward from the waist, placing the hands palms down on the floor in front of the body, with the fingers facing.  bows are performed to teachers and superiors.  and  bows respectively are less deep and less long. From a kneeling position and bowing from the waist, the hands are slid over the knees until the tips of the fingers touch the floor in front of the body. They are performed among persons of similar rank.

Students of tea ceremony bow to each other and to their teacher; each class begins with bows between the teacher and students. If a senior student is teaching a junior student, bows are exchanged between the two. Before beginning a practice, a student bows to all the other students as well. This pattern is repeated when the practice ends.

A bow is performed at the door before entering the tea room, or tea house. Finally one greets the teacher, and then the other students, or the other guests, with bows. This pattern is repeated when leaving the tea room as well.

The host of a tea ceremony bows before beginning the ceremony. Bows are exchanged repeatedly throughout a tea ceremony, between the host and guest of honor, among the guests, between guests and the hosts assistants, and between the host and guests.

In religious settings

Eastern religions
In many Eastern religions bowing is used as a sign of respect in worship and has its origins in the Indian "Añjali Mudrā".

Sikhism
Sikhs only bowed to their Gurus, who were the messengers of god. Their holy book, the Guru Granth Sahib is seen as the eternal guru after the death of their living gurus, as it has the word of god written by the past living gurus. In a Gurdwara, Sikhs bow to the Guru Granth Sahib and are not permitted to take part in idol worshiping, bowing to anything other than the Guru Granth Sahib or bowing to any living person.

Shinto
Bows are performed in Shinto settings. Visitors to a Shinto shrine will clap or ring a bell to attract the attention of the enshrined deity, clasp the hands in prayer, and then bow.

Buddhism

Bowing is a common feature for worship in Buddhism. Zen Buddhism, for example, has a daily ritual in which practitioners do 1,080 full prostration bows, usually spread throughout the day.  More casual practitioners and laypeople typically do 108 bows once a day instead.

Hinduism

In the Hindu traditions people show deference by bowing or kneeling down and touching feet of an elder or respected person.
Traditionally, a child is expected to bow down to their parents, teachers and elders during certain formal ceremonies and casual settings.

Abrahamic religions

Judaism
In the Jewish setting, bowing, similar to in Christianity, is a sign of respect, and is done at certain points in Jewish services. By tradition, in the Temple in Jerusalem, kneeling was part of the regular service, but this is not part of a modern Jewish service.

Some bows within the current liturgy are simple bows from the waist — others (especially during parts of the Amidah) involve bending the knees while saying Baruch (Blessed), bowing from the waist at Atah ([are] you) and then straightening up at Adonai (God). During the concluding Aleinu section of the services, congregants usually bow when they say "V'anachnu kor'im u'mishtachavim u'modim," meaning "we bend our knees, prostrate, and acknowledge our thanks." Another moment in the service which triggers the bow is during the "Bar'chu". Many bow at the mention of "Adonai" (the Jewish addressing of the Lord) at this and various other parts in the service (most likely if they are to remain standing during that prayer). 

Kneeling is retained in modern Orthodox Judaism, but only on the High Holy Days — once on each day of Rosh Hashanah (when the Aleinu prayer is recited during the Amidah), and four times on Yom Kippur — again, once for Aleinu, and three times during a central portion of the service when the details of the Avodah, the High Priest's service in the Temple are recited.

The Talmudic texts as well as writings of Gaonim and Rishonim indicate that total prostration was common among many Jewish communities until some point during the Middle Ages.  Members of the Karaite denomination practice full prostrations during prayers. Ashkenazi Jews prostrate during Rosh Hashana and Yom Kippur as did Yemenite Jews during the Tachanun part of regular daily Jewish prayer until somewhat recently. Ethiopian Jews traditionally prostrated during a holiday specific to their community known as Sigd. Sigd comes from a root word meaning prostration in Amharic, Aramaic, and Arabic. There is a move among Talmide haRambam, a small modern restorationist group with perspectives on Jewish law similar to that of Dor Daim, to revive prostration as a regular part of daily Jewish worship.

Christianity
 
Communicants of many Christian denominations bow at the mention of the name of Jesus, while inside of a church and outside of one. The origin of this practice is within Sacred Scripture, which states: "Therefore God also highly exalted Him and gave Him the name that is above every name, so that at the name of Jesus every knee should bend, in heaven and on earth and under the earth" (NRSV). This pious custom was mandated in the Second Council of Lyon, which proclaimed "Whenever that glorious name is recalled, especially during the sacred mysteries of the Mass, everyone should bow the knees of his heart which he can do even by a bow of his head." The eighteenth canon of the Church of England, mother Church of the Anglican Communion, made this external obeisance obligatory during the divine service, declaring: "When in time of divine service the Lord JESUS shall be mentioned, due and lowly reverence shall be done by all persons present, as it has been accustomed; testifying by these outward ceremonies and gestures their inward humility, Christian resolution, and due acknowledgement that the Lord JESUS CHRIST, the true eternal Son of God, is the only Saviour of the world, in whom alone all the mercies, graces, and promises of God to mankind for this life, and the life to come, are fully and wholly comprised." Likewise, in the Lutheran Churches, people are "to bow when the name of Jesus is mentioned", and in the Roman Catholic Church "at the mention of the name of Jesus, there is a slight bow of the head". John Wesley, the founder of the Methodist Churches, also taught the faithful "to bow at the Name of Jesus" and as a result, it is customary for Methodists to bow at the mention of His name, especially during the recitation of the Creed.

In Christian liturgy, bowing is a sign of respect or deference.  In many Christian denominations, individuals will bow when passing in front of the altar, or at certain points in the service (for example, when the name of Jesus Christ is spoken, as mentioned above). It may take the form of a simple bow of the head, or a slight incline of the upper body. A profound bow is a deep bow from the waist, and is often done as a substitution for genuflection.
In Eastern Orthodoxy, there are several degrees of bowing, each with a different meaning. Strict rules exist as to which type of a bow should be used at any particular time. The rules are complicated and are not always carried out in all parishes.

In the Roman Rite of the Catholic Church, a profound bow, prostration, a slight bow of the head (during the Creed) genuflection, and kneeling are all prescribed in the liturgy at various points. In addition, there are two forms of genuflection, depending on whether or not the Blessed Sacrament is exposed on the altar or not. In addition to bowing at the mention of the name of Jesus, in the Anglican Communion, "A reverence in the form of a bow is made to an altar, because it is as it were God's throne, and in a manner represents Him." As with Anglican churches, in Lutheran and Methodist churches, when approaching the chancel, it is customary to bow towards the altar (or altar cross). In Anglican churches a bow is also made when the processional cross passes by a communicant in a church procession.

Conservative Protestant Christians such as Brethren, Mennonite, and Seventh-day Adventists make a practice of kneeling during community prayer in the church service.  Until the mid-1900s this was common practice among many Protestant Christian groups.

According to the New Testament writer Paul, everyone on Earth will someday bow to Jesus Christ.  He writes in Philippians 2:9-11, "Wherefore God also hath highly exalted him, and given him a name which is above every name: That at the name of Jesus every knee should bow, of things in heaven, and things in earth, and things under the earth; And that every tongue should confess that Jesus Christ is Lord, to the glory of God the Father." KJV.  He is here quoting a similar passage regarding bowing from the Old Testament, Isaiah 45:23.

Islam

In Islam, there are two types of bowing, Sujud and Ruk'u. Sajdah or Sujud is to prostrate oneself to Allah in the direction of the Kaaba at Mecca which is done during daily prayers (salat). While in sujud, a Muslim is to praise Allah and glorify him. The position involves having the forehead, nose, both hands, knees and all toes touching the ground together.

Ruku' is bowing down in the standing position during daily prayers (salat). The position of ruku' is established by bending over, putting one's hands on one's knees, and remaining in that position while also praising Allah and glorifying Him.

In Islam, it is shirk (major sin) to bow to a human being with the intention to worship, or if that person is considered divine by the bower. Muslims are only supposed to bow, with the intention to worship, to Allah. Moreover, bowing as a greeting or sign of thanks or respect, without an intent to worship, is also classified as shirk (major sin) and forbidden according to a specific hadith in Sunan-at-Tirmidhi.

See also

References

External links

More information on bowing in religious settings

 
Gestures
Human positions
Greetings
Parting traditions
Gestures of respect
Articles containing video clips